The Fight for the Ultimatum Factory ( is a 1923 Soviet silent adventure film directed by Dmitri Bassalygo.

Cast
 Vasiliy Aristov as Komsomol member Fedya 
 Vladimir Karin 
 Mikhail Lenin
 Olga Tretyakova 
 Tsekhanskaya

References

Bibliography 
 Christie, Ian & Taylor, Richard. The Film Factory: Russian and Soviet Cinema in Documents 1896-1939. Routledge, 2012.

External links 
 

1923 films
Soviet silent feature films
1920s Russian-language films
Soviet black-and-white films
Soviet adventure films
1923 adventure films
Silent adventure films